The 2007 Star Mazda Championship was the ninth season of the Star Mazda Championship, an open wheel auto racing series that competes using spec chassis and engines. The season featured 12 races over 12 weekends, with only road courses and street circuits featuring on the schedule. The overall season champion was Dane Cameron, while Dan Tomlin, III and Steve Hickham won the Expert and Masters classes respectively.

Cameron finished on the podium in eight of the twelve races and finished well ahead of second-place finisher, Australian James Davison who won once at Mosport. Canadian Lorenzo Mandarino won twice and finished eights in points as he finished outside the top-ten seven times. Canadian Marco Di Leo won the season opener at Sebring International Raceway but it would be his only win of the season. His brother Daniel finished second in that race. Ron White won back-to-back races in the rounds at Road America
and Circuit Trois-Rivières and finished third in points.

Drivers and teams

Race calendar and results

Final points standings

References

External links
 Star Mazda Championship Official website

Star Mazda Championship
Indy Pro 2000 Championship